Ovia South-West is a Local Government Area of Edo State, Nigeria. Its headquarters are in the town of Iguobazuwa. It has an area of 2,803km and a population of 135,356 at the 2006 census. The postal code of the area is 302.

It has several places and cities, such as Aghobahi, Igueze and Udo.

References

Local Government Areas in Edo State